Freja Siri Margareta Olofsson (born 24 May 1998) is a Swedish professional footballer who plays as a midfielder for Real Madrid in the Primera Iberdrola.

Club career 
Olofsson began her professional career with KIF Orebro, making 69 appearances for the Swedish club. After tearing her ACL after seven appearances with Arna-Bjørnar, Olofsson returned in 2020 with KIF and scored twice in 21 appearances.

She signed a one-year contract with National Women's Soccer League club Racing Louisville FC in 2021, starting 20 league matches in her first season. She signed a three-year contract with Racing Louisville in May 2022, but started only 9 league matches in her second season before being transferred under new manager Kim Björkegren.

On 7 September 2022, Racing announced the transfer of Olofsson to Real Madrid four months into her three-year contract with Racing, in exchange for an undisclosed transfer fee.

References

External links
 
 Freja Olofsson on realmadrid.com

1998 births
Living people
Swedish women's footballers
Sportspeople from Örebro
KIF Örebro DFF players
Damallsvenskan players
Women's association football midfielders
Racing Louisville FC players
National Women's Soccer League players
Expatriate soccer players in the United States
Real Madrid Femenino players
Primera División (women) players
Expatriate women's footballers in Spain
Swedish expatriate women's footballers
Swedish expatriate sportspeople in Spain